Clytius (Ancient Greek: Κλυτίος), also spelled Klythios, Klytios, Clytios, and Klytius, is the name of multiple people in Greek mythology:

 Clytius, one of the Giants, sons of Gaia, killed by Hecate during the Gigantomachy, the battle of the Giants versus the Olympian gods.
 Clytius, an alternative name for Clytoneus, the son of Naubolus of Argos and father of Nauplius II.
 Clytius, son of Agriopas and grandson of Cyclops. He fought in the war between Eumolpus and Eleusis and fell alongside Eumolpus' son Immaradus and Egremus, son of Eurynomus.
 Clytius, the Athenian father of Pheno who married King Lamedon of Sicyon. Ianiscus, descendant of this Clytius, became king in Sicyon after Adrastus.
 Clytius, a man killed by Perseus in the battle against Phineus.
 Clytius, a  warrior in the army of Dionysus during the god's Indian campaign. He was killed by Corymbasus.
 Clytius, an Argonaut and an Oechalian prince as son of King Eurytus and Antiope or Antioche, and thus brother to Iole, Toxeus, Deioneus, Molion, Didaeon and Iphitos. According to Hyginus, he was killed by Aeetes, if the text is not corrupt; according to Diodorus Siculus, however, he was killed by Heracles during the latter's war against Eurytus.
 Clytius,  in a rare version of the myth, a son of Phineus and brother of Polymedes: the two brothers killed Phineus' second, Phrygian, wife (Idaea?) at the instigation of Cleopatra.
 Clytius, a Trojan prince as the son of King Laomedon and brother of the later ruler Priam. He was also one of the Elders of Troy during the siege of the city. By Laothoe, he was the father of Caletor, Procleia and Pronoe or Pronome, of whom the latter was the mother of Polydamas by Panthous.
 Clytius, son of Alcmaeon and Arsinoe or Alphesiboea. He moved from Psophis to Elis in order to escape his mother's vengeful brothers. The Clytidae, a clan of soothsayers, claimed descent from him. According to Stephanus of Byzantium, his mother was Triphyle, the eponym of Triphylia.
 Clytius, each of the three namesakes among the Suitors of Penelope: one from Dulichium, another from Same, and the third from Zacynthus. These men asked the hand in marriage of Penelope but suffered the same fate at the hands of the hero Odysseus. The latter shot all of them dead with the aid of Eumaeus, Philoetius, and Telemachus.
 Clytius, an attendant of Telemachus in Homer's Odyssey, the father of Telemachus' friend Peiraeus. Dolops, a Greek warrior killed by Hector in the Iliad, could also have been his son.
 Clytius, one of the sons of Aeolus who followed Aeneas to Italy and was killed by Turnus.
 Clytius, father of Euneus (one of those killed in the battle between Aeneas and Turnus).
 Clytius, a young soldier in the army of Turnus who was loved by Cydon in Virgil's Aeneid, and was killed by Aeneas.
 Clytius, father of Acmon and Menestheus from Lyrnessus, Phrygia.

To these can be added several figures not mentioned in extant literary sources and only known from various vase paintings:

Clytius, a companion of Peleus present at the wrestling match between Peleus and Atalanta.
Clytius, an arms-bearer of Tydeus present at the scene of murder of Ismene, on a vase from Corinth.
Clytius, a barbarian-looking participant of a boar hunt, possibly the Calydonian hunt, on the Petersburg vase #1790.
Clytius, a man standing in front of the enthroned Hygieia, on a vase by the Meidias Painter.
Clytius, an epithet of Apollo, in an inscription.

Notes

References 

Apollodorus, The Library with an English Translation by Sir James George Frazer, F.B.A., F.R.S. in 2 Volumes, Cambridge, MA, Harvard University Press; London, William Heinemann Ltd. 1921. ISBN 0-674-99135-4. Online version at the Perseus Digital Library. Greek text available from the same website.
Apollonius Rhodius, Argonautica translated by Robert Cooper Seaton (1853–1915), R. C. Loeb Classical Library Volume 001. London, William Heinemann Ltd, 1912. Online version at the Topos Text Project.
Apollonius Rhodius, Argonautica. George W. Mooney. London. Longmans, Green. 1912. Greek text available at the Perseus Digital Library.
Diodorus Siculus, The Library of History translated by Charles Henry Oldfather. Twelve volumes. Loeb Classical Library. Cambridge, Massachusetts: Harvard University Press; London: William Heinemann, Ltd. 1989. Vol. 3. Books 4.59–8. Online version at Bill Thayer's Web Site
Diodorus Siculus, Bibliotheca Historica. Vol 1–2. Immanel Bekker. Ludwig Dindorf. Friedrich Vogel. in aedibus B. G. Teubneri. Leipzig. 1888–1890. Greek text available at the Perseus Digital Library.
Gaius Julius Hyginus, Fabulae from The Myths of Hyginus translated and edited by Mary Grant. University of Kansas Publications in Humanistic Studies. Online version at the Topos Text Project.
 Homer, The Iliad with an English Translation by A.T. Murray, Ph.D. in two volumes. Cambridge, MA., Harvard University Press; London, William Heinemann, Ltd. 1924. . Online version at the Perseus Digital Library.
Homer, Homeri Opera in five volumes. Oxford, Oxford University Press. 1920. . Greek text available at the Perseus Digital Library.
 Homer, The Odyssey with an English Translation by A.T. Murray, PH.D. in two volumes. Cambridge, MA., Harvard University Press; London, William Heinemann, Ltd. 1919. . Online version at the Perseus Digital Library. Greek text available from the same website.
Nonnus of Panopolis, Dionysiaca translated by William Henry Denham Rouse (1863–1950), from the Loeb Classical Library, Cambridge, MA, Harvard University Press, 1940.  Online version at the Topos Text Project.
Nonnus of Panopolis, Dionysiaca. 3 Vols. W.H.D. Rouse. Cambridge, MA., Harvard University Press; London, William Heinemann, Ltd. 1940–1942. Greek text available at the Perseus Digital Library.
Pausanias, Description of Greece with an English Translation by W.H.S. Jones, Litt.D., and H.A. Ormerod, M.A., in 4 Volumes. Cambridge, MA, Harvard University Press; London, William Heinemann Ltd. 1918. . Online version at the Perseus Digital Library
Pausanias, Graeciae Descriptio. 3 vols. Leipzig, Teubner. 1903.  Greek text available at the Perseus Digital Library.
Publius Ovidius Naso, Metamorphoses translated by Brookes More (1859–1942). Boston, Cornhill Publishing Co. 1922. Online version at the Perseus Digital Library.
Publius Ovidius Naso, Metamorphoses. Hugo Magnus. Gotha (Germany). Friedr. Andr. Perthes. 1892. Latin text available at the Perseus Digital Library.
Publius Vergilius Maro, Aeneid. Theodore C. Williams. trans. Boston. Houghton Mifflin Co. 1910. Online version at the Perseus Digital Library.
Publius Vergilius Maro, Bucolics, Aeneid, and Georgics. J. B. Greenough. Boston. Ginn & Co. 1900. Latin text available at the Perseus Digital Library.
Stephanus of Byzantium, Stephani Byzantii Ethnicorum quae supersunt, edited by August Meineike (1790–1870), published 1849. A few entries from this important ancient handbook of place names have been translated by Brady Kiesling. Online version at the Topos Text Project.
This article incorporates text from the public domain 1848 edition of Lemprière's Classical Dictionary.
Wilhelm Heinrich Roscher (ed.): Ausführliches Lexikon der griechischen und römischen Mythologie. Band 2.1 (I-K), Leipzig, 1890–1894, ss. 1247 – 1248
Realencyclopädie der Classischen Altertumswissenschaft, Band XI, Halbband 21, Katoikoi-Komödie (1921), ss. 895 – 896

Gigantes
Argonauts
Trojans
Characters in the Iliad
Suitors of Penelope
Characters in the Odyssey
Characters in the Aeneid
Attican characters in Greek mythology
Ancient Thrace
Arcadian mythology
Mythology of Sicyon
Characters in the Argonautica